Tanwa Savage is a 2021 Nigerian comedy drama film produced, written and directed by Geshin Salvador. The film stars Segun Arinze, Timini Egbuson, Bimbo Ademoye and Linda Osifo in the lead roles. The film is based on a true life marriage story whereas the woman requests a DNA test from her husband. It had its theatrical release on 22 January 2021.

Cast 

 Segun Arinze
 Timini Egbuson
 Bimbo Ademoye
 Linda Osifo
 Nkechi Blessing
 Uzor Arukwe
 Joseph Momodu
 Maryam Giwa
 Kehinde Okunola
 Chioma Peters

References 

English-language Nigerian films
Nigerian comedy-drama films
2021 comedy-drama films
2020s English-language films
Nigerian films based on actual events